Sahoué is a port in Gabon.  It is served by the Trans-Gabon Railway.  It is located northwest of the capital at the extreme end of the Santa Clara peninsula.

See also 
 Transport in Gabon

Ports and harbours in Africa
Transport in Gabon